is an island in Nishi-ku, Fukuoka, Japan.  The island was seriously damaged by the 2005 Fukuoka earthquake. The affected areas of the island were reconstructed by 2008.

Access

Hakata Port - Genkai Island Port

References

Geography of Fukuoka
Islands of Fukuoka Prefecture